The squat dance (Ukrainian: гопак, hopák. Russian: прися́дка, prisyádka) is an eastern Slavic folk dance. East Slavic dance arose from millitary Cossack traditions and later has spread as folk dance. The squat dance originated in regions of today's Ukraine. Besides East Slavic-speaking countries, squat dancing is also used to some degree in Indian and Hmong dances.

The squat dance is an integral feature of Russian folk culture. With kicks in the air, turns, and stomping movements, it is one of the main elements in Russian fast dances. The squat dance appears in Russian dances such as Barynya, Leto, Kalinka, Yablochko, Trepak, Kozachok and others. The squat dance is performed only by males.

While dancers squat with folded arms, they kick their legs, alternating between high and low kicks. Accelerating the legs and walking while squatting is common. Some dancers squat with their feet on the ground while others stay on their toes. The dance demands tight muscles and good balance.

History
Squat dance mainly developed out of the culture of the eastern Slavs. 
In Old Russian villages there were contests of dancers held. People bet and typed which dancers would win. The winner either received a material gift or money and the gifts were then shared with the crew. The Squat dance existed in Old Russia as a dance and as a fighting dance.

See also
 Russian folk dance
 Ukrainian dance

References

Russian folk dances
Russian culture
Partial squatting position